Dale Kobayashi is an American politician currently serving as the Hawaii state representative in Hawaii's 23rd district. He won the seat after incumbent Democrat Isaac Choy decided not to run for reelection in 2018. He defeated several Democratic candidates in the District 23 primaries and won unopposed in the general election. He ran for District 23 in 2016 as well, losing in a primary election to incumbent Isaac Choy.

References

Living people
Democratic Party members of the Hawaii House of Representatives
21st-century American politicians
Year of birth missing (living people)
Place of birth missing (living people)
University of Southern California alumni
Yale University alumni
Hawaii politicians of Japanese descent